An English cricket team led by Lord Hawke toured North America in September and October 1894 and two of its matches are considered to have been first-class. This was the second tour to North America led by Hawke: he had previously led a side there in 1891–92 and three of the players from the earlier tour, not including Hawke, were also on this second one.

The team played six matches in all, five of them in the United States and one in Canada. The games against the Gentlemen of Philadelphia were of three days' duration, though the second was finished inside two days, and are considered first-class. Other games in New York, Toronto and Lowell, Massachusetts, were each scheduled for two days and are not considered first-class; the match in Lowell was finished inside a single day and an exhibition game, also not first-class, was played on the second day without a result.

The team
Hillyard, McAlpine and Wright had been part of Lord Hawke's previous team to North America in 1891–92.

The tour
Hawke's team left London on 8 September 1894, sailing from Southampton that day. At the time of the departure, the team was expected to be playing matches in "New York, Philadelphia, Baltimore and Boston" and to be returning home by 1 October. The tour was in fact extended by a couple of weeks with a visit to Canada, but a report in England indicates that it was not entirely a success: "The English cricketers in America are losing their power to attract, there is a decrease in the number of spectators at their matches with their Yankee opponents, their doings appear to excite less interest, and their victories are not so much taken to heart as they used to be," said a note in the Cheltenham Chronicle newspaper. "Cricket is losing its hold upon the American public, who having gone wild over the short and exciting game of baseball, are losing all taste for our prosaic natural [sic] pastime."

Not all the team came back together: newspapers record the arrival of eight members of the team in Southampton on 17 October 1894.

First-class matches
Two first-class matches were played on the tour, both of them against the Gentlemen of Philadelphia side. McAlpine was omitted from the team for both of these matches.

Other games
There were three other matches, each of two days' duration, scheduled on the tour, none of them first-class. The team began with a 12-a-side match against an "All New York" team at the Staten Island Cricket Club ground: Hawke's side batted for the whole of the first day and the second was lost entirely to rain. The first-class matches in Philadelphia came next, after which the side headed for Toronto and a two-day game against a "Gentlemen of Canada" side which was drawn. In what was intended to be the final game of the tour, the team played a Massachusetts side, with Hawke's team 12-strong and the Americans 15; the numbers did not help and the touring team triumphed by an innings inside a single day. A "fill-up" single innings match was arranged for the vacant second day, but this match appears not to have been completed, and the scorecard does not give full detail of the home side.

References

1894 in English cricket
English cricket tours of North America
International cricket competitions from 1888–89 to 1918